The southern skink (Oligosoma notosaurus) is a species of skink in the family Scincidae.  It is endemic to New Zealand.

Range
This species is only known to inhabit Stewart Island and Codfish Island, south of the South Island, New Zealand. It is also known from Betsy Island in the Stewart Island archipelago. It has been recorded at altitudes between sea level and 700 m.

Conservation status 
As of 2012 the Department of Conservation (DOC) classified the southern skink as Not Threatened under the New Zealand Threat Classification System. It is one of the most common lizard species in the Stewart Island archipelago.

Habitat and ecology
This species is found in sand dunes, grasslands, wetlands, scrub and rocky areas, and forest clearings.

References

notosaurus
Reptiles of New Zealand
Endemic fauna of New Zealand
Reptiles described in 1990
Taxa named by Geoff B. Patterson
Taxa named by Charles H. Daugherty
Taxonomy articles created by Polbot
Endemic reptiles of New Zealand